Curtis Granderson Jr. (born March 16, 1981), nicknamed the Grandyman, is an American former professional baseball outfielder. He played 16 seasons in Major League Baseball (MLB) for the Detroit Tigers, New York Yankees, New York Mets, Los Angeles Dodgers,  Toronto Blue Jays, Milwaukee Brewers, and Miami Marlins.

Granderson played college baseball at the University of Illinois at Chicago. He was selected by the Tigers in the 2002 MLB draft. He made his MLB debut with the Tigers in 2004. Granderson is a three-time MLB All-Star, and won a Silver Slugger Award in 2011. As of 2019, he led active players in career triples, was 2nd in career strikeouts, was 5th in career home runs, and was the 6th-oldest player in the National League.

Off the field, Granderson is recognized for his commitment to the community through outreach and charity work. Many of his charitable endeavors support inner-city children. He has also served as an ambassador for MLB abroad. Granderson won the Marvin Miller Man of the Year Award four times and the Roberto Clemente Award in 2016 in recognition of his contributions in the community.

Early years
Granderson grew up in Blue Island, Illinois, and Lynwood, Illinois, south suburbs of Chicago. His father, Curtis Sr., was a dean and physical education teacher at Nathan Hale Elementary School in Illinois. His mother, Mary, taught chemistry at Curie Metropolitan High School in Chicago. Granderson's half-sister, Monica, is an English professor at Jackson State University.

As a child, Granderson grew up a fan of the Atlanta Braves, choosing not to root for the hometown Chicago Cubs because he often rushed home from school to watch Saved by the Bell and was disappointed when a Cubs game was on instead. Granderson attended Thornton Fractional South High School (T.F. South) in Lansing, where he played baseball and basketball. During his high school baseball career, Granderson batted .369 with 11 home runs and 88 runs batted in (RBI), and was named an All-State selection his senior year. Granderson wore uniform number 14 at T.F. South, choosing it because his father wore it while playing softball. T.F. South honored Granderson by retiring his jersey in a December 2011 ceremony.

College career
Granderson was pursued in recruitment by a number of college baseball programs, and he chose the University of Illinois at Chicago (UIC), in part because they allowed him to play basketball in addition to baseball. However, Granderson quit basketball two weeks into his freshman year in order to concentrate on baseball. As a freshman at UIC in 2000, Granderson led the UIC Flames baseball team with seven home runs and 45 walks. He followed that by hitting .304 as a sophomore, leading the team in runs, home runs, and walks. After his sophomore year, Granderson played in a summer collegiate league for the Mankato Mashers, now known as the MoonDogs, of the Northwoods League, where he batted .328 in 44 games, with eight doubles, two triples, one home run, 17 RBI, 28 runs scored, and 15 stolen bases.

During his junior season at UIC, Granderson batted .483, second in the nation to Rickie Weeks. Granderson was named Second-Team All-American by Baseball America and USA Today'''s Baseball Weekly and a Third-Team Louisville Slugger NCAA Division I All-American. He graduated from UIC with a double major in business administration and business marketing. On February 6, 2013 Granderson had his number 28 retired by UIC.

Professional career

Minor leagues
The Detroit Tigers selected Granderson in the third round of the 2002 MLB draft. The Tigers assigned Granderson to the Oneonta Tigers, their Minor League Baseball affiliate in the Class A-Short Season New York-Penn League. With Oneonta, Granderson batted .344 in 52 games. Determined to complete his college education, though the fall semester began before the minor league season ended, Granderson made arrangements to begin his senior year at UIC via internet courses.

The Tigers assigned Granderson to the Lakeland Tigers of the Class A-Advanced Florida State League in 2003 and the Erie SeaWolves of the Class AA Eastern League in 2004. With the SeaWolves, Granderson hit .303 with 21 home runs and 93 RBIs. Baseball America named Granderson the Tigers' minor league player of the year and top prospect after the 2004 season. Prior to the 2005 season, Baseball America rated Granderson as the 57th best prospect in baseball. Granderson competed for the role as the Tigers' starting center fielder in 2005 spring training, but the organization decided he needed more seasoning, and assigned him to the Toledo Mud Hens of the Class AAA International League. With Toledo, he hit .290 with 15 home runs, 65 RBIs and 22 stolen bases.

Detroit Tigers

2004–2005
The Tigers promoted Granderson to the MLB for the first time in September 2004. He made his MLB debut on September 13 against the Minnesota Twins. He received his second promotion to the majors in July 2005, and he appeared in six games. After his third promotion to the MLB, in August, he remained in the majors permanently. Granderson had his first career MLB inside-the-park home run on September 15, a five-hit game September 18 and a walk-off home run on September 26 against the Chicago White Sox.

2006

Granderson became the Tigers starting center fielder for the 2006 season after beating out Nook Logan for the position during spring training. From the start of his major league career in 2004, Granderson began a 151-game errorless streak, the longest by a position player to start his career since Dave Roberts went errorless in 205 games. Granderson hit two home runs during the 2006 American League Division Series and one in the 2006 American League Championship Series, but struggled in the 2006 World Series, batting .095, as the Cardinals defeated the Tigers.

2007

Through June, Granderson ranked first among American League (AL) outfielders in triples (14), third in doubles (22), tied for fourth in runs (58) and tied for 10th in homers (11) with a .289 batting average in the 2007 season. Although Granderson was not listed on the 2007 All-Star Game ballot, due to the Tigers' decision to put Gary Sheffield as an outfielder on the ballot, he still received 376,033 write-in votes, the most write-in votes for any player. Granderson was named the AL Player of the Week on July 16, the first time he had won the award, as he hit .500 (8 for 16) with two doubles, a triple, and a home run during that week.  Granderson slugged .938, drove in two runs, scored seven runs, and had fifteen total bases during Detroit's four-game series against the Seattle Mariners.

On August 7, Granderson became the second player in franchise history to have at least 30 doubles, 15 triples, 15 home runs, and ten stolen bases in a single season when he hit a double in a game against the Tampa Bay Devil Rays.  The other Tiger to accomplish this feat was Charlie Gehringer in 1930. He became the sixth member of baseball's 20–20–20 club on September 7, joining the Kansas City Royals' George Brett (1979), Willie Mays of the New York Giants (1957), Cleveland's Jeff Heath (1941), St. Louis' Jim Bottomley (1928), and Frank Schulte of the Chicago Cubs (1911). Granderson stole his 20th base of the season on September 9, joining Mays and Schulte as the only players in major league history to reach 20 doubles, 20 triples, 20 home runs, and 20 stolen bases in a season, a feat accomplished by the Philadelphia Phillies' Jimmy Rollins 21 days later.

Granderson hit .302 with 23 home runs for the season, and was 26 for 27 in stolen base attempts.  He also improved his plate discipline, as he finished seventh in the AL in strikeouts with 141. He was one of only six batters in the AL to have at least 20 home runs and 20 stolen bases, along with teammate Gary Sheffield, Ian Kinsler, Alex Rodriguez, Grady Sizemore and B. J. Upton.

During the 2007 season, Granderson accumulated 23 triples, which led all of baseball. The American League and Detroit Tigers record is 26 triples, a feat achieved by the all-time triples king, Sam Crawford, in 1914. Granderson is the first player since 1949 to manage at least 23 in a single season.  Only ten of his triples were at home despite the fact Comerica Park has seen more triples since it opened in 2000 than any other ballpark in baseball. Granderson joined the 20-20-30-20 club, having more than 20 triples, 20 home runs, 30 doubles, and 20 stolen bases. The last player to accomplish the feat was Wildfire Schulte in 1911. Granderson's 23 triples were as much or more than six entire teams managed in 2007; the Chicago White Sox, Cincinnati Reds, Los Angeles Angels of Anaheim, Oakland Athletics, Seattle Mariners and St. Louis Cardinals all had no more than 23 team triples.

2008–2009
Prior to the start of the 2008 season, the Tigers signed Granderson to a five-year, US$30.25 million contract with a club option for 2013. Granderson continued hitting well during the 2008 regular season, finishing with a .280 batting average, 13 triples and 22 home runs.  He continued to improve his plate discipline, striking out only 111 times (versus 141 in 2007 and 174 in 2006) and drawing a career-high 71 walks.  During August, he hit six triples, including two in consecutive innings during a game against the Texas Rangers.

With the Tigers failing to make the playoffs in 2007 and 2008, TBS employed Granderson as a commentator alongside Cal Ripken Jr., Dennis Eckersley and Frank Thomas for its coverage of the 2007 and 2008 postseasons.

Granderson was chosen to appear in the 2009 MLB All-Star Game. It was his first All Star appearance. In the game, he hit a triple in the top of the 8th inning and scored the winning run.

New York Yankees

2010
After the 2009 season, the Tigers began shopping Granderson to other franchises in an effort to reduce their payroll. The Yankees acquired Granderson in a three-team trade on December 9. In the deal, the Yankees received Granderson while sending Phil Coke and centerfielder Austin Jackson to Detroit. Also, the Arizona Diamondbacks received Yankees pitcher Ian Kennedy and Tigers pitcher Edwin Jackson in return for young pitchers Max Scherzer and Daniel Schlereth, who joined the Tigers.

Granderson hit a home run in his first Yankee at bat on April 4, 2010, becoming the twelfth player to do so. Although he missed some games due to a strained groin, Granderson finished the season with 136 games played, a .247 batting average, and 24 home runs. Granderson, who struggled against left-handed pitching throughout his career, also put up subpar numbers against right-handed pitchers, causing Granderson to revamp his swing with the help of hitting coach Kevin Long in August 2010.

2011

Granderson's work with Long was credited as a reason for his strong 2011 campaign. Granderson received over 6.6 million votes for the 2011 MLB All-Star Game. In August 2011, Granderson and Mark Teixeira became the first Yankees teammates to hit 30 home runs in 115 games since Roger Maris and Mickey Mantle in 1961. On August 10, Granderson hit two home runs against the Los Angeles Angels of Anaheim to tally a career-high 31 home runs. Granderson, Robinson Canó, and Russell Martin all hit grand slams in a game against the Oakland Athletics on August 25, the first time a team had three grand slams in one game. Granderson was named American League Player of the Month for August 2011, in which he batted .286, with a .423 on-base percentage, slugged .657, hit ten home runs, recorded 29 RBI, and scored 29 runs, and had the highest number of pitches per plate appearance in the major leagues (4.44). He became the first player in MLB history to record 40 home runs, 10 triples and 25 stolen bases in one season. Granderson finished fourth in balloting for the American League Most Valuable Player Award.

2012
On May 6, 2012, Curtis achieved his 1,000th hit against the Kansas City Royals. On August 26, 2012, Granderson hit his 200th career home run against the Cleveland Indians. He finished the 2012 season with a .232 batting average, 43 home runs, 106 RBI, and set a new Yankees season record by striking out 195 times.

2013
On October 19, the Yankees exercised Granderson's club option for 2013. Originally worth $13 million, it became a $15 million option after he placed 4th in the MVP voting in 2011. In his spring training debut against the Toronto Blue Jays on February 24, 2013, Granderson was hit by a pitch from J. A. Happ that fractured his right forearm. He was placed on the 15-day disabled list to begin the 2013 season. He returned to the Yankees on May 14. On May 18, 2013, Granderson made his first start at right field. On May 24, 2013, Granderson broke the knuckle of his left pinkie finger after getting hit by Tampa Bay's Cesar Ramos's pitch in the 5th inning. He was again placed on the 15-day disabled list. On May 29, 2013, Granderson underwent surgery in which a pin was inserted to the knuckle to stabilize the fracture. On August 2, 2013, Granderson was activated from the disabled list. Granderson was limited to only 61 games in 2013 batting .229 with 7 home runs and 15 RBI. He became a free agent for the first time of his career after the season.

New York Mets

2014

Granderson agreed to terms with the New York Mets on a four-year contract worth $60 million on December 6, 2013. Granderson's salaries were set at $13 million in 2014, $16 million in 2015 and 2016, and $15 million in 2017. On May 12, Granderson returned to Yankee Stadium for the first time since he signed with the Mets, and went 2 for 5 with a home run. The Mets played Granderson as their right fielder. He started 148 games with 130 in right field. He batted .227, and had the highest number of pitches per plate appearance in the major leagues (4.37). Granderson played in a total of 205 games between May 15, 2013 and September 16, 2014, during which time he did not ground into a double play, a record which still stands .

2015
In 2015, he became the team's primary leadoff hitter. He went on to lead the team in games played, runs scored, hits, stolen bases, walks, on-base percentage and total bases en route to a National League East division title. In the third game of the National League Division Series, Granderson picked up five RBI – this tied a Mets single game postseason record previously set by Carlos Delgado in the 2006 National League Championship Series, Edgardo Alfonzo in the 1999 NLCS and Rusty Staub in the 1973 World Series. After beating the Los Angeles Dodgers in five games in the NLDS, the Mets went on to sweep the Chicago Cubs in four games in the NLCS and advance to their first World Series since 2000.

Granderson and Daniel Murphy were the two most productive hitters in the Mets lineup during their 2015 postseason run to the World Series. While Murphy cooled off in the World Series against the Kansas City Royals, Granderson continued to be a consistent threat for the Mets out of the leadoff spot and also had three home runs and five RBIs in that World Series. In Game 1, after the Royals tied the game in the ninth inning with a home run off Mets closer Jeurys Familia, Granderson made an excellent leaping catch with nobody out in the bottom of the 11th inning, off the bat of the Royals fastest runner Jarrod Dyson, preventing what would have at least been a lead off triple and likely saving the game at the time, though the Royals would go on to win the game anyway in the bottom of the 14th inning on a sacrifice fly by Eric Hosmer.

2016–2017
On May 27, 2016, Granderson hit a walkoff home run against the Los Angeles Dodgers. He was the first batter up in the bottom of the 9th inning. As of June 16, 2016, Granderson had hit 17 leadoff homers since joining the Mets in 2014, a franchise record. On September 17, Granderson hit two solo home runs against the Minnesota Twins at Citi Field. The first tied the ballgame in the bottom of the 11th inning and the second won the game in the bottom of the 12th inning. He became only the eighth player in Major League history to hit multiple home runs in extra innings of the same game.
In the National League Wild Card Game against the San Francisco Giants on October 5, Granderson made an incredible catch to save several runs from scoring late in the close game.

On June 14, 2017, Granderson hit his 300th career home run in a Mets win over the Chicago Cubs. He batted .228 with the Mets in 2017, and for the season had the highest number of pitches per plate appearance in the major leagues (4.52).

Later career

Los Angeles Dodgers
On August 18, 2017, the Mets traded Granderson to the Los Angeles Dodgers for a player to be named later, identified as Jacob Rhame. He hit his first home run for the Dodgers on August 20 against Justin Verlander of the Tigers. After hitting a grand slam home run in his last at-bat for the Mets on August 17, he hit one for the Dodgers on August 21 and became the first player in MLB history to hit grand slams for two different teams within the same week. The following day, he stole his 150th career base, becoming the 36th player in MLB history with over 300 home runs and 150 or more steals. He batted .161/.288/.366 for the Dodgers, in 112 at bats.  He was 1-for-15 with eight strikeouts in the first two rounds of the playoffs, and the Dodgers left him off the World Series roster.

Toronto Blue Jays
On January 23, 2018, Granderson signed a one-year, $5 million contract with the Toronto Blue Jays. On April 18, facing the Kansas City Royals, Granderson hit his ninth career grand slam. On April 24, Granderson hit his first walkoff home run since 2016 in a 10th inning victory against the Boston Red Sox. On May 15, Granderson returned to Citi Field for the first time since he was traded to the Los Angeles Dodgers on August 18, 2017 and went 1 for 4 with a single. On June 10, against the Baltimore Orioles, Granderson hit for a career high six RBIs with a home run, two doubles, a single and a walk. On June 25, while playing the Houston Astros, Granderson hit his eighth and ninth home runs of the season off of former teammate Justin Verlander to lead the Jays to victory.

Milwaukee Brewers
On August 31, 2018, the Blue Jays traded Granderson to the Milwaukee Brewers for Demi Orimoloye. He batted .220 for the Brewers. Granderson was a part of the 2018 playoff team.

Miami Marlins

On February 5, 2019, Granderson signed a minor league contract with the Miami Marlins that included an invitation to spring training and provided him with a $1.75 million salary if he made the major league roster, which he did - batting .189 in the first half of the season.

For the 2019 season he batted .183/.281/.356 in 317 at bats, with his on base percentage and slugging percentages both career lows. He was the sixth-oldest player in the National League.

Retirement and post-playing career

Granderson announced his retirement from baseball on January 31, 2020. As of 2021, he serves as the president of the Players Alliance, an organization of active and former Major League players that works to increase opportunities for black athletes to participate in professional baseball. As of 2022, Granderson is a host for MLB on TBS.

Personal life
Granderson is an avid fan of WWE, and attended WrestleMania 23 in Detroit. He considers The Ultimate Warrior, The Undertaker, Junkyard Dog and "Macho Man" Randy Savage to be his favorite wrestlers.  He is also an avid fan of college basketball and of the Kansas Jayhawks.

Off the field, Granderson has served as an ambassador for Major League Baseball International. He has traveled to England, Italy, the Netherlands, France, South Africa, China, New Zealand, South Korea and Japan to promote baseball. In appreciation for his efforts, Commissioner Bud Selig penned a thank you letter to Granderson which read in part, "There are so many fine young men playing Major League baseball today, but I can think of no one who is better suited to represent our national pastime than you." He has also served as something of an unofficial baseball ambassador to the African-American community, often participating in and initiating dialogue about the lack of Black players at all levels of the sport. When he endorsed Nike, Inc., Louisville Slugger and Rawlings, he asked them to donate money to his foundation or equipment to inner-city baseball programs rather than pay him.

His foundation, Grand Kids Foundation, has raised money to benefit the educations of inner-city children around the country. Granderson wrote a children's book, All You Can Be: Dream It, Draw It, Become It!, which was published in August 2009. The book is illustrated by students of the New York City public school system. In February 2010, Granderson represented MLB at a White House function announcing Let's Move!, a childhood anti-obesity effort sponsored by First Lady of the United States Michelle Obama. Granderson donated $5 million to help UIC build a new baseball stadium in 2013.

Granderson has been involved in the Major League Baseball Players Association (MLBPA) since 2006. He has taken part in negotiations of the labor contract. Granderson was chosen as the 2009 Marvin Miller Man of the Year by the MLBPA for his off-field work, an award he won again in 2016, 2018 and 2019.

In 2011, Granderson was also voted one of the friendliest players in the Major Leagues, according to a poll conducted by Sports Illustrated'' of 290 players. During his playing career, Granderson wore his socks high to honor players from the Negro leagues.

Publications

See also

 20–20–20 club
 List of Major League Baseball annual triples leaders
 List of Major League Baseball career home run leaders
 List of Major League Baseball career runs scored leaders

References

External links

1981 births
Living people
African-American baseball players
American expatriate baseball players in Canada
American League All-Stars
American League RBI champions
Baseball players from Illinois
Detroit Tigers players
Erie SeaWolves players
Grand Canyon Rafters players
Lakeland Tigers players
Los Angeles Dodgers players
Major League Baseball broadcasters
Major League Baseball center fielders
Major League Baseball right fielders
Miami Marlins players
Milwaukee Brewers players
New York Mets players
New York Yankees players
Oneonta Tigers players
People from Blue Island, Illinois
People from Lynwood, Illinois
Scranton/Wilkes-Barre RailRiders players
Scranton/Wilkes-Barre Yankees players
Silver Slugger Award winners
Sportspeople from the Chicago metropolitan area
Tampa Yankees players
Toledo Mud Hens players
Toronto Blue Jays players
Trenton Thunder players
UIC Flames baseball players
West Michigan Whitecaps players
World Baseball Classic players of the United States
2009 World Baseball Classic players
21st-century African-American sportspeople
20th-century African-American people